Séamus Casey (born 1997) is an Irish hurler who plays for Wexford Senior Championship club Oylegate-Glenbrien and at inter-county level with the Wexford senior hurling team. He usually lines out as a left corner-forward.

Career statistics

References

1997 births
Living people
Oylegate-Glenbrien hurlers
Wexford inter-county hurlers